Redi Tlhabi (born 1978) is a South African journalist, producer, author and a former radio presenter. She presented The Redi Tlhabi Show on Radio 702 for over a decade. Her broadcasting career spans years spent at Kaya FM, being a newscaster for the SABC and later, eMedia Holdings owned eNews Channel Africa, eNCA. 
Tlhabi has an Honours degree in Political Economy and English Literature. She has been a television and radio journalist for the SABC and eTV.

After 12 years of working for 702, a radio station in South Africa, Tlhabi announced her departure at the station. She was set to leave for the USA for a fellowship. She has since postponed her move to America.

Controversy

In 2013, Tlhabi won the Alan Paton Award for her book, Endings and Beginnings. The book describes Tlhabi's relationship with a notorious gangster as she was growing up, after the death of her father. Tlhabi claims that she changed the names of the characters, but the mother of a gangster of the same name claims that the names are accurate but is disputing some of the facts in the book.

Personal life

Tlhabi married Brian Tlhabi, a medical practitioner, in 2010.

She is the mother to 2 daughters, Khumo Tlhabi and Neo Tlhabi.

She is the stepmother of comedian Lesego Tlhabi.

Books

Awards
2013 Alan Paton Award for Endings and Beginnings.

References 

Living people
1978 births
South African journalists
South African women journalists
South African radio journalists
South African radio presenters
South African women radio presenters
Women radio journalists
South African non-fiction writers
21st-century non-fiction writers
Women non-fiction writers